The Liverpool City Region Labour Party mayoral selection of 2016 was the process by which the Labour Party selected its candidate for Mayor of the Liverpool City Region, to stand in the mayoral election on 4 May 2017.
 
Voting ending on Friday 5 August 2016, with the result to be announced on Wednesday 10 August. Steve Rotheram had called for the voting deadline to be extended until Friday 12 August after delays in issuing ballot papers, but in the event, on 10 August Rotheram was declared the winning candidate.

Candidates

Declined
 Barrie Grunewald, Leader of St Helens Council, had been seen as a potential contender. Grunewald later endorsed Rotheram.

Endorsements
Joe Anderson
 Louise Ellman, MP for Liverpool Riverside (1997–present)
 Stephen Twigg, MP for Liverpool West Derby (2010–present), Enfield Southgate (1997–2005)
 Peter Dowd, MP for Bootle (2015–present)
 Phil Davies, Leader of Wirral Council
 Andy Moorhead, Leader of Knowsley Council
 Phil Redmond, English television producer and screenwriter

Steve Rotheram
Bill Esterson, MP for Sefton Central (2010–present)
 Barrie Grunewald, Leader of St Helens Council
 Sue Johnston, English actor.
 Peter Kilfoyle, MP for Liverpool Walton (1991–2010)

Membership ballot
The results of the selection were announced on 10 August 2016. Turnout was 72%, with 4,955 votes cast, and 83 invalid votes.

See also
 Greater Manchester Labour Party mayoral selection, 2016
 London Labour Party mayoral selection, 2015

References

External links
Liverpool Labour Party website

2010s in Merseyside
Elections in Merseyside
2017 English local elections
History of the Labour Party (UK)